Stephenson Nunatak is a prominent, pyramid-shaped rock nunatak, rising to about 640 m, which rises 300 m above the surrounding ice at the northwest side of Kirwan Inlet in the southeast part of Alexander Island, Antarctica. Discovered and roughly surveyed in 1940-41 by Finn Ronne and Carl R. Eklund of the United States Antarctic Service. Resurveyed in 1949 by the Falkland Islands Dependencies Survey and named by the United Kingdom Antarctic Place-Names Committee for Alfred Stephenson, surveyor with the British Graham Land Expedition, who led a sledge party south into George VI Sound to about 72S in 1936. There happens to be another landform on Alexander Island which is named after Alfred Stephenson, that being Mount Stephenson, the highest point of Alexander Island rising to 2,987 m.

See also 

 Admirals Nunatak
 Atoll Nunataks
 Dione Nunataks

Further reading 
 Damien Gildea, Antarctic Peninsula - Mountaineering in Antarctica: Travel Guide
 New Zealand Journal of Geology and Geophysics 1977, P 870
 Nichols, Gary & Cantrill, David. (2002), Tectonic and climatic controls on a Mesozoic forearc basin succession, Alexander Island, Antarctica, Geological Magazine. 139. 313–330. https://doi.org/10.1017/S0016756802006465

External links 

 Stephenson Nunatak on USGS website
 Stephenson Nunatak on SCAR website
 Obituary: Alfred Stephenson

References 

Nunataks of Alexander Island